Insurance Regulatory Authority may refer to:

 Insurance Regulatory Authority (Kenya)
 Insurance Regulatory Authority of Uganda